The New England Center for Children (NECC) is a nonprofit, private, special education school in Southborough, Massachusetts, United States. NECC provides comprehensive services for children with autism spectrum disorder between the ages of 3-22 years old. They have a school serving 200 students, about half living in one of the 14 residential group homes.

To serve as many children with autism as possible, training is a critical part of NECC's mission. All new staff are provided initial training, ongoing professional development, and graduate program opportunities. Over its nearly five decade history, NECC has trained thousands of professionals who are now providing state-of-the-art care and services worldwide, whether through consulting, teaching, or their own programs.

The John and Diane Kim Autism Institute was built in 2016 and is home to NECC's research center, where researchers study how children with autism best learn. This data is published in top peer-reviewed journals and is also directed into the ACE® ABA Software System, the patented curriculum developed at NECC and used by educators around the world.

History
L. Vincent Strully, Jr., Dudley Orr, and John Pangburn founded the Efficacy Research Institute (ERI) on the grounds of the Taunton State Hospital in 1975.  The school started with six students. Over the next five years, Dr. Paul Touchette established the research program and the school expanded to 20 students.

In 1980, ERI took over Spear Education Center in Framingham. ERI in Taunton became ERIT, managed by Kathy Foster, and the Spear Education Center became ERIF and was managed by Vinnie Strully.

In 1985, Dr. Paul Touchette, Dr. Rebecca MacDonald, and Susan Langer published the first professional research article in the Journal of Applied Behavior Analysis:  “A Scatter plot for identifying stimulus control of problem behavior.” The following year, ERIT and ERIF merged to become The New England Center for Autism (NECA) and moved to its present location in Southborough, MA.

NECA opened its first residential home in Westborough in 1987 and over the next four years, 11 more residential homes opened in the Metrowest area to serve children with autism from all across the Commonwealth.

Dr. Murray Sidman, Professor Emeritus, Northeastern University, joined NECA as Senior Research Associate and established an on-site research lab to continue his work on stimulus equivalence.

By 1991, NECA established a center-based preschool program serving young children with autism and PDD (pervasive developmental disorder). The program provided intensive behavioral instruction and opportunities for integration with typically developing peers, leading to systematic transition into the public schools.

The following year, a master’s in applied behavior analysis (ABA) program through Northeastern University was established along with a partnership with Simmons College to provide a master’s degree in education and licensure in severe special needs.

In 1993, Dr. Gina Green was appointed NECA’s first Director of Research. Under her leadership, NECA strengthened its research program and began to publish work regularly in peer-reviewed scientific journals. A US Department of Education training grant provided funding for a joint program with the Eunice Kennedy Shriver Center.

By 1996, NECA rebranded to The New England Center for Children (NECC), emphasizing its mission in providing best-in-class educational services for children with autism, PDD, and related disabilities. Later that year, the Center opened a Staff Intensive Unit (SIU) – a unique residential complex for children with severely challenging behaviors. Today the SIU is known as the Intensive Treatment Team (ITT). At the same time, Dr. Rebecca MacDonald and Renée Mansfield started NECC’s home-based program to serve children with autism under the age of 3 from the central campus in Southborough.

In 1997, NECC brought a private program to Abu Dhabi, in the United Arab Emirates. They established the Gulf Cooperation Council (GCC) Consulting division which included Bahrain, Kuwait, Oman, Qatar, Saudi Arabia, and the United Arab Emirates. NECC also opened its Professional Development Center. This additional space allowed expansion of its program for professional development by providing additional classrooms for NECC trainings as well as affiliated graduate study programs

NECC’s Public School Services division established the first Partner Program Classroom in Ashburnham/Westminster public school. This set the foundation for ongoing collaborations with many other public schools.

At the turn of the century, Dr. William Ahearn, Dr. Dan Gould, Richard Graff, Dr. Gina Green, Cammarie Johnson, Allen Karsina, Susan Langer, Dr. Myrna Libby, and Dr. Rebecca MacDonald became NECC’s first Board Certified Behavior Analysts (BCBAs). NECC also opened a new, state-of-the-art preschool and early childhood center at its Southborough site, and the first lesson plan was published in the Autism Curriculum Encyclopedia® (ACE®).

In 2005, NECC received the Award for Enduring Programmatic Contributions in Behavior Analysis from the Society for the Advancement of Behavior Analysis (SABA). The award represents meaningful acknowledgement for their work in ABA by peer institutions.

A year later, the ACE® software expanded beyond NECC classrooms and moved into public schools across New England, and NECC received a Kresge Foundation Challenge Grant to build the Michael S. Dukakis Aquatic Center. In 2007, NECC opened a school in Abu Dhabi, as a directive of His Highness Sheikh Mohammed bin Zayed Al Nahyan, Crown Prince of Abu Dhabi.

NECC's research continued to gain notoriety as Western New England College established a PhD program on-site at NECC. In 2010, the journal article "Stereotypy in young children with autism and typically developing children" was distinguished as one of the "Top 10 most-cited articles" by the journal Research in Developmental Disabilities. The article was authored by NECC staff members Dr. Rebecca MacDonald, Renée Mansfield, Amy Geckeler, Nicole Gardenier, Dr. William Holcomb, June Sanchez, Dr. Gina Green and Jen Anderson.

In 2013, NECC-AD moved to a state-of-the-art facility in Mohammed Bin Zayed City, Abu Dhabi. Three years later, a 33,000 square foot building was constructed - The John and Diane Kim Autism Institute - marking the biggest expansion of the NECC campus to date. The Kim Autism Institute is home to professional development, executive offices, business units, graduate classrooms, and research space.

In 2017, the Dillon Arledge Student Center opened, providing a student store, classrooms for music, art, leisure, career development and vocational training and a library. A year later, NECC unveiled ABAplus®, an online learning platform for professionals. Shortly thereafter, NECC-Clinic in Dubai Healthcare City, UAE opened as NECC continues to spread its award-winning services across the Gulf.

References

Autism-related organizations in the United States
Educational institutions established in 1975
Private schools in Massachusetts
Schools for people on the autistic spectrum
Southborough, Massachusetts
Special schools in the United States
Therapeutic boarding schools in the United States
1975 establishments in Massachusetts